The Subcommittee on Environment was a subcommittee within the U.S. House of Representatives Oversight and Accountability Committee. It was dissolved for the 118th Congress after Republicans took control of the House of Representatives and James Comer became the full committee chairman.

Jurisdiction
The Subcommittee had oversight jurisdiction over: global climate change; environmental protection, public lands, endangered species, air and water quality; oceans; public health; conservation; international agreements; energy policy, research and development; and oversight and legislative jurisdiction over regulatory affairs and federal paperwork reduction.

Members, 117th Congress

Historical membership rosters

115th Congress

116th Congress

References

External links
Subcommittee page

Oversight Environment